1082 Pirola  is a dark Themistian asteroid from the outer regions of the asteroid belt. It was discovered on 28 October 1927, by German astronomer Karl Reinmuth at the Heidelberg-Königstuhl State Observatory in Germany, and assigned the provisional designation . It was named after the herbaceous plant Pyrola (wintergreen).

Orbit and classification 

When applying the hierarchical clustering method to its proper orbital elements, Pirola is a Themistian asteroid that belongs to the Themis family, a large family of nearly 6,000 known carbonaceous asteroids, named after 24 Themis. It orbits the Sun in the outer main belt at a distance of 2.6–3.7 AU once every 5 years and 6 months (2,013 days; semi-major axis of 3.12 AU). Its orbit has an eccentricity of 0.18 and an inclination of 2° with respect to the ecliptic. The body's observation arc begins with its official discovery observation at Heidelberg in October 1927.

Naming 

This minor planet was named after Pyrola, also known as wintergreen, a herbaceous plant (mostly evergreen), that belongs to the flowering herbs. The official naming citation was mentioned in The Names of the Minor Planets by Paul Herget in 1955.

Reinmuth's flowers 

Due to his many discoveries, Karl Reinmuth submitted a large list of 66 newly named asteroids in the early 1930s. This list also contained a sequence of 28 asteroids, starting with 1054 Forsytia, that were all named after plants, in particular flowering plants (also see list of minor planets named after animals and plants).

Physical characteristics 

In the Tholen classification, Pirola is a carbonaceous C-type asteroid, which matches the overall spectral type of the Themis family.

Rotation period 

In 2010, three rotational lightcurves of Pirola were obtained from photometric observations. Lightcurve analysis gave a rotation period of 15.85, 15.851 and 15.8525 hours with a brightness amplitude between 0.53 and 0.62 magnitude.

A 2016-published lightcurve, using modeled photometric data from the Lowell Photometric Database, gave a concurring period of 15.8540 hours, as well as two spin axis of (123.0°, −42.0°) and (300.0°, −38.0°) in ecliptic coordinates (λ, β).

Diameter and albedo 

According to the surveys carried out by the Japanese Akari satellite and the NEOWISE mission of NASA's Wide-field Infrared Survey Explorer, Pirola measures between 37.363 and 44.67 kilometers in diameter and its surface has an albedo between 0.052 and 0.0867. The Collaborative Asteroid Lightcurve Link derives an albedo of 0.0655 and a diameter of 41.06 kilometers based on an absolute magnitude of 10.51.

References

External links 
 Lightcurve Database Query (LCDB), at www.minorplanet.info
 Dictionary of Minor Planet Names, Google books
 Asteroids and comets rotation curves, CdR – Geneva Observatory, Raoul Behrend
 Discovery Circumstances: Numbered Minor Planets (1)-(5000) – Minor Planet Center
 
 

001082
Discoveries by Karl Wilhelm Reinmuth
Named minor planets
001082
19271028